

Results
Arsenal's score comes first

London Combination

Selected results from the league.

Final League table

References

1916-17
English football clubs 1916–17 season